Mile High Edge were a W-League club based in Denver, Colorado, USA. Until 2005 the team was known as the Mile High Mustangs. The team folded after the 2007 season.

Year-by-year

External links 
Official Site

Women's soccer clubs in the United States
Soccer clubs in Denver
Soccer clubs in Colorado
Defunct USL W-League (1995–2015) teams
2003 establishments in Colorado
2007 disestablishments in Colorado
Association football clubs established in 2003
Association football clubs disestablished in 2007
Women's sports in Colorado